Falmouth is a coastal port town located in Saint Paul Parish on the island of Antigua, in Antigua and Barbuda. The town is located in the south of the island, at the end of Falmouth Harbour. A road links Falmouth with the nearby larger town of Liberta inland to the north. In 2018, a proposal was made for squatters who had lived on their land for ten years or more to buy their plots for $1 per foot².

Demographics 
Falmouth has one enumeration district, ED 71600.

Census Data (2011)

See also 
English Harbour

References 

Populated places in Antigua and Barbuda
Saint Paul Parish, Antigua and Barbuda